Stephen Weah is a Liberian international football (soccer) striker, and now a football (soccer) coach in Australia.

He has previously played for Preston Lions FC.

He is the cousin of Liberian legend George Weah, Christopher Wreh, and George Weah Jr., who is also a player.

References

Year of birth missing (living people)
Living people
Liberian footballers
Association football forwards
Place of birth missing (living people)